Helastia clandestina is a moth of the family Geometridae. This species is endemic to New Zealand. It is classified as "At Risk, Relict'" by the Department of Conservation.

Taxonomy
This species was first described by Alfred Philpott in 1921 using a specimen collected by E.S. Gourlay at Arthur's Pass and named Xanthorhoe clandestina. George Hudson discussed and illustrated this species in his 1928 book The Butterflies and Moths of New Zealand under the same name. In 1987 Robin C. Craw placed this species within the genus Helastia. The holotype specimen is held at the Canterbury Museum.

Description
Philpott described the species as follows:

Distribution
This species is endemic to New Zealand. It occurs in Westland, North Canterbury and Mid Canterbury.

Biology and lifecycle
Very little is known about the biology of H. clandestina. Hudson records it being on the wing in February.

Host species and habitat
The host species for the larvae of H. clandestina is unknown. H. clandestina prefers stony riverbed habitat such as at the Waimakariri River flood plain.

Conservation status
This moth is classified under the New Zealand Threat Classification system as being "At Risk, Relict".

References

Moths of New Zealand
Endemic fauna of New Zealand
Moths described in 1921
Cidariini
Endangered biota of New Zealand
Endemic moths of New Zealand